Dick Chrobak (born 1938) is a Canadian football player who played for the Edmonton Eskimos and BC Lions.

References

Living people
1938 births
Edmonton Elks players